Davante Lavell Adams (born December 24, 1992) is an American football wide receiver for the Las Vegas Raiders of the National Football League (NFL). He played college football at Fresno State, and was selected by the Green Bay Packers in the second round of the 2014 NFL Draft.

Early years
Adams was born to Douglas Adams and Pamela Brown on December 24, 1992. He has a brother and two sisters. From East Palo Alto, California, Adams attended Palo Alto High School in neighboring Palo Alto, California. As a senior two-way starter for the Vikings football team, he led the school to a CIF state championship. He had 64 receptions for 1,094 yards and 12 touchdowns, and as a cornerback on defense he totaled 44 tackles, including two for a loss, two forced fumbles, an interception, and four passes defended. He also played basketball and was considered a two-star recruit in that sport. Lettering all four years in basketball, he averaged 9.0 points, 5.8 rebounds, and 5.4 assists as a senior. He was recruited by Fresno State, California, Hawai'i, and San Diego State. Adams committed to play college football at Fresno State.

College career
Adams attended California State University, Fresno, where he played on the Fresno State Bulldogs football team from 2011 to 2013.

In 2011, Adams redshirted as a true freshman at Fresno State in his only season with then-head coach Pat Hill.

2012 season
In the 2012 season, Adams had a new head coach in Tim DeRuyter. He became an instant contributor in the Bulldogs' 9–4 season. In his collegiate debut, he had 118 receiving yards and two touchdowns in a win over the Weber State Wildcats on September 1, 2012. On September 29, against the San Diego State Aztecs, he had eight receptions for 102 yards. On October 6, against the Colorado State Rams, he had the first of eight consecutive games with a receiving touchdown. In the win, he had four receptions for 41 yards and two touchdowns. On October 27, a road game against the New Mexico Lobos, he had nine receptions for 198 yards and two touchdowns. On November 10, in a road game against the Nevada Wolf Pack, he had nine receptions for 120 yards and a touchdown. In the regular season finale against the Air Force Falcons, he had nine receptions for 141 yards and two touchdowns. On Christmas Eve, against the SMU Mustangs, he had 13 receptions for 144 yards and a touchdown in the 43–10 loss in the 2012 Hawaii Bowl. Overall, in the 2012 season, he had 102 receptions for 1,312 yards and 14 touchdowns. All three led the Mountain West Conference. He was the conference's Freshman of the Year and a freshman All-American. He was the MVP of the 2012 Hawaii Bowl.

2013 season
Adams continued to be a very productive member of the offense in the Bulldogs' 11–2 season in 2013. He started the 2013 season with 14 receptions for 148 yards and two touchdowns in a 52–51 win over the Rutgers Scarlet Knights. On September 20, against the Boise State Broncos, he had 12 receptions for 110 yards and a touchdown in the 41–40 victory to give the Bulldogs a 3–0 record. On October 5, in a road game against the Idaho Vandals, he had 16 receptions for 185 yards and three touchdowns in the 61–14 victory. Two weeks later, against the UNLV Rebels, he had eight receptions for 221 yards and four touchdowns in the 38–14 victory. Adams scored on a 75-yard touchdown to start the game. On November 23, against the New Mexico Lobos, he had nine receptions for 246 yards and four touchdowns in the 69–28 victory to help get the Bulldogs to a 10–0 record. In the following road game against the San Jose State Spartans, he had 13 receptions for 264 yards and three touchdowns in the 62–52 loss, Fresno State's first of the season. On December 7, against the Utah State Aggies in the regular season finale, he had nine receptions for 168 yards and a touchdown in the MWC Championship Game.  In his final collegiate game, the 2013 Las Vegas Bowl against the USC Trojans, he had nine receptions for 74 yards and a touchdown. Overall, in the 2013 season, he led the nation with 131 receptions for 1,719 yards and 24 touchdowns. He set a Mountain West Conference record with his 24 touchdown receptions, eight more than any player in the country in 2013, and the total ranks fourth in single-season FBS history. He also set Fresno State career records for receptions (233) and touchdown receptions (38) despite playing just two seasons for the Bulldogs. He was named second-team All-America by The Associated Press.

On December 27, 2013, Adams announced that he would forgo his final two college seasons and enter the 2014 NFL Draft.

College statistics

Professional career

Green Bay Packers
Adams was selected in the second round with the 53rd overall pick by the Green Bay Packers in the 2014 NFL Draft. He was the ninth wide receiver to be selected that year. On June 12, 2014, he signed a contract with the Packers.

2014

After playing in the number four receiver slot in his NFL debut against the Seattle Seahawks, Adams took 37 snaps in the second game against the New York Jets, where he had 5 catches for 50 yards. Entrenched as the Packers' number three receiver, on October 2, Adams scored his first NFL touchdown on an 11-yard pass from Aaron Rodgers in a 42–10 victory over the Minnesota Vikings. The score was Rodgers' 200th career touchdown pass. On October 26, Adams had a personal-best 7 receptions in a loss to the New Orleans Saints. He tallied his first 100-yard receiving game on November 30 with six receptions for 121 yards in a 26–21 win over the New England Patriots. 

Though a distant third to Jordy Nelson and Randall Cobb, Adams' 446 receiving yards and 3 touchdowns were a solid rookie contribution to the 12–4 Packers. On January 11, 2015, Adams set the Packers' rookie record for receiving yards in a playoff game with 117 in the victory over the Dallas Cowboys, including a 46-yard touchdown. In the NFC Championship against the Seattle Seahawks, he was held to one reception for seven yards in the 28–22 overtime loss.

2015

Adams started the 2015 season with four receptions for 59 yards in a 31–23 victory over the Chicago Bears. Adams missed three games after an ankle injury in week 2, and suffered a knee injury in the playoffs. On November 8, against the Carolina Panthers, he had seven receptions for a season-high 93 yards. In the following game, he had a season-high 10 receptions for 79 yards in the loss to the Detroit Lions. On December 3, in the second game against the Lions, he had his only touchdown of the season in the 27–23 victory. 

In between, his second season was a "dud", finishing fourth on the team in receptions (50) and receiving yards (483), with 1 touchdown, all for a team without star Jordy Nelson. However, his efforts preparing for 2016 earned him the unofficial "off-season MVP" award.

2016

The work-ethic paid off, as Adams recorded five touchdowns through his first six games in 2016. On October 26, Adams was named NFC Offensive Player of the Week after catching 13 passes for 132 yards and two touchdowns against the Chicago Bears in Week 7. He topped this total with a Packers' season-best 156 yards 47–25 road loss against the Tennessee Titans. On November 28, against the Philadelphia Eagles, he had 113 yards and two touchdowns in the 27–13 victory. 

Adams finished as the Packers' second leading receiver with 997 yards on 75 catches for 12 touchdowns (second in the NFL only to teammate Jordy Nelson). Adams began the post-season with eight receptions including a touchdown, and the 13th-most post-season receiving yards in Packers history with 125 in a win over the New York Giants. He added 76 yards in the division win over the Dallas Cowboys, and a touchdown in the championship loss to the Atlanta Falcons.

2017

Adams began the year with three receptions for 47 yards in a 17–9 home victory over the Seattle Seahawks. In Week 2, in a 34–23 loss to the Atlanta Falcons, Adams had eight receptions for 99 yards, which included a 33-yard touchdown. In the Week 4 game against the Chicago Bears, Adams had to be taken to a hospital in an ambulance after a strong helmet-to-helmet hit by Chicago linebacker Danny Trevathan, who earned a 2-game suspension (later reduced to one game). The next week, he returned with 7 receptions for 66 yards and 2 touchdowns, including the game-winner with 11 seconds left against the Dallas Cowboys.

Early in Week 6, starter Aaron Rodgers suffered a broken clavicle against the Minnesota Vikings, and would not return for nine weeks. With inexperienced back-up Brett Hundley, Adams averaged five receptions for 40 yards in three straight losses, before recording 90 yards on five receptions and the eventual game-winning touchdown in a Week 10 win over the Chicago Bears, and 126 yards on eight receptions against the Baltimore Ravens in Week 11. He also had 82 yards, including a season-long 55-yard touchdown in a Week 12 31–28 road loss to the Pittsburgh Steelers in a game where Hundley showed improvement. After catching only four passes for 42 yards in Week 13 against the Tampa Bay Buccaneers, Adams had his first 10-reception game of the season for 82 yards, including the game-tying touchdown with 17 seconds left, and a 25-yard walk-off touchdown in overtime to defeat the Cleveland Browns. At that point, he was tied for second in the NFL with 9 receiving touchdowns. 

In Week 15, Adams suffered another concussion following a helmet-to-helmet hit from Panthers linebacker Thomas Davis. Due to the concussion, Adams missed the final two games of the season. He finished the season starting in 14 games, finished first on the team with 74 catches for 885 yards and 10 touchdowns. He was named to his first Pro Bowl and was ranked 45th by his peers on the NFL Top 100 Players of 2018.

On December 29, 2017, Adams signed a four-year, $58 million contract extension with the Packers.

2018

With the return of Aaron Rodgers from injury, Adams had a touchdown reception in each of the Packers' first three games, while averaging 6.7 receptions for 68 yards. On route to eight receptions for 81 yards in Week 4, Adams suffered a calf injury but continued to play due to more severe injuries to teammates Randall Cobb and Geronimo Allison. In Week 5, Adams had nine receptions for 140 yards and a touchdown in a 31–23 loss to the Detroit Lions. In a Week 6 Monday Night Football win over the San Francisco 49ers, Adams recorded 10 receptions for 132 yards and two touchdowns, including a 38-yard reception, 16-yard game-tying touchdown, and two catches for 27 yards to set up the go-ahead field goal all in the final three minutes. 

After a Week 7 bye, Adams had his third consecutive 100-yard game with five receptions for 133 yards in a narrow 29–27 road loss to the Los Angeles Rams. After being limited in yards but recording three touchdowns in his next two games, Adams had a career-best 166 yards on 10 receptions in a Week 11 loss to the Seattle Seahawks. A week later, in a 24–17 loss to the Minnesota Vikings, Adams had five receptions for 69 yards and a touchdown. In the game, Adams reached 1,000 yards receiving in a season for the first time in his career and scored his tenth touchdown of the season, which gave him his third consecutive season of double-digit receiving touchdowns. He had a touchdown in each of the next two games as well. In Week 15 against the Chicago Bears, Adams had 8 catches for 119 yards in a 24–17 loss, putting him over 100 receptions in a season for the first time in his career. 

In Week 16 against the New York Jets, with the Packers eliminated from the playoffs, Adams had 11 receptions for 71 yards and caught the game-winning touchdown in overtime. Rather than risk worsening a nagging knee injury, Adams sat out the final week of the season, ending one reception (with 111) and 133 yards (with 1,386) short of the franchise season receiving records.

2019

During Week 2 against the Minnesota Vikings, Adams caught seven passes for 106 yards as the Packers won 21–16. Two weeks later against the Philadelphia Eagles, Adams recorded a career-high 180 yards receiving on 10 receptions before exiting the game with 10 minutes left in the fourth quarter with a turf toe injury. The Packers went on to lose 34–27. Adams missed the next four games; he returned to the field during a Week 9 26–11 road loss to the Los Angeles Chargers, finishing with seven receptions for 41 yards. In the next game against the Carolina Panthers, Adams caught seven passes for 118 yards in the 24–16 victory. 

After a Week 11 bye, the Packers went on the road to face the San Francisco 49ers. In that game, Adams caught seven passes for 43 yards along with his first touchdown of the season and a two-point conversion, accounting for all of the Packers' points in the 37–8 road loss. During Week 13 against the New York Giants, Adams caught six passes for 64 yards and two touchdowns in the 31–13 road victory. Two weeks later against the Chicago Bears, he caught seven passes for 103 yards and a touchdown during the 21–13 win. In the next game against the Vikings on Monday Night Football, Adams caught 13 passes for 116 yards in a 23–10 road victory.

In the Divisional Round against the Seattle Seahawks, Adams caught eight passes for a postseason franchise record 160 yards and two touchdowns during the 28–23 victory. In the NFC Championship against the 49ers, he had nine receptions for 138 yards in the 37–20 road loss. In the process, Adams became the only Packer with two games of 100+ receiving yards in a single postseason and three career postseason games with 125+ receiving yards.

2020

During Week 1 against the Minnesota Vikings, Adams finished with 156 receiving yards and two receiving touchdowns on 14 receptions (tying Don Hutson's franchise record) as the Packers won 43–34. During Week 7 against the Houston Texans, Adams finished with 13 catches for 196 receiving yards and two touchdowns as the Packers won 35–20. In Week 8 against the Minnesota Vikings, he had seven receptions for 53 receiving yards and three receiving touchdowns in the 28–22 loss. In Week 9 against the San Francisco 49ers on Thursday Night Football, he had ten receptions for 173 receiving yards and a touchdown in the 34–17 victory. In Week 11 against the Indianapolis Colts, Adams recorded seven catches for 106 yards and a touchdown during the 34–31 overtime loss. In Week 12 against the Chicago Bears, Adams recorded his 500th career catch on a 12-yard touchdown pass from Aaron Rodgers, becoming the fifth receiver in Packers history to reach that mark.

In Week 13 against the Philadelphia Eagles, Adams recorded ten catches for 121 yards and two touchdowns during the 30–16 win. Adams' second touchdown reception was the 400th career touchdown pass thrown by Aaron Rodgers.
In Week 14 against the Detroit Lions, Adams recorded seven catches for 115 yards and a touchdown during the 31–24 win. On December 21, 2020, he was selected for the 2021 Pro Bowl. Despite heavy snowfall, Adams caught 11 passes for 142 yards and three touchdowns in a 40–14 rout of the Tennessee Titans on Sunday Night Football in Week 16.  The outing helped the Adams-Rodgers connection set the new Packers team record of 492 completions which took seven seasons. Overall, he finished the 2020 season with 115 receptions for 1,374 receiving yards and 18 receiving touchdowns. Adams had a historic season in 2020: he led the league in with 18 receiving touchdowns, the most since Randy Moss had 23 in 2007, and tying Sterling Sharpe's single-season franchise record (1994). His 115 receptions also set a franchise best, usurping Sharpe's 1993 season. On January 8, 2021, he made the 2020 All-Pro Team first-team.

In the Divisional Round of the playoffs against the Los Angeles Rams, Adams recorded nine catches for 66 yards and a touchdown during the 32–18 win.
In the NFC Championship against the Tampa Bay Buccaneers, Adams recorded nine catches for 67 yards and a touchdown during the 31–26 loss.

2021

In the first month on the 2021 season, Adams had a 121-yard game against the Detroit Lions and a 12-catch, 132-yard game against the San Francisco 49ers in Week 2. In Week 5 against the Cincinnati Bengals, Adams secured a career-high 206 yards on 11 receptions alongside a touchdown in the 25–22 overtime win. In Week 11 against the Minnesota Vikings, Adams caught seven passes for 115 yards and two touchdowns in the 31–34 loss. In Week 13 against the Chicago Bears, Adams caught ten passes for 121 yards and two touchdowns in the 45–30 win. 

On December 23, 2021, Adams was named to his fifth consecutive Pro Bowl. He broke his own single-season franchise record for receptions the following week with an 11 reception, 136-yard, one touchdown performance in a 37–10 victory over the Minnesota Vikings. He then broke the Packers' single season receiving yards record the following week, ending with 1,553 yards in a season. He was selected to the 2021 All-Pro Team for the second consecutive season. In the Divisional Round against the San Francisco 49ers, he had nine receptions for 90 yards in the 13–10 loss.

On March 8, 2022, the Packers placed a franchise tag on Adams. On March 14, Adams informed the Packers that he would not play under the franchise tag for the 2022 season.

Las Vegas Raiders
On March 18, 2022, the Packers traded Adams to the Las Vegas Raiders in exchange for their 2022 first-round pick and second-round pick. Along with the trade, Adams signed a five-year, $141.25M deal, making him the highest-paid wide receiver in the NFL at the time of the signing. The trade also reunited Adams with his college quarterback Derek Carr, with whom he played at Fresno State from 2012 to 2013.

2022

Adams made his Raiders debut in Week 1 against the Los Angeles Chargers, where he caught 10 passes for 141 yards and a touchdown in the 19–24 loss. Adams’s first win with the Raiders came in Week 4 in a 32–23 Raiders victory over the Denver Broncos in a game where Adams had nine receptions for 101 yards.

In Week 5, against the Kansas City Chiefs, Adams had three receptions for 124 yards and two touchdowns in the 30–29 loss. After the game, he shoved cameraman Ryan Zebley to the ground while walking towards the tunnel to exit the field. Adams later apologized to Zebley and said that frustration over the way the game had ended caused him to react rashly. Zebley was hospitalized for his injuries and pressed charges through the Kansas City Police Department. Adams was later charged with misdemeanor assault.

In Week 9, against the Jacksonville Jaguars, he had ten receptions for 146 receiving yards and two receiving touchdowns in the 27–20 loss. In Week 10, against the Indianapolis Colts, he had nine receptions for 126 receiving yards and one receiving touchdown in the 25–20 loss. In Week 11 against the Denver Broncos, Adams had seven catches for 141 yards and two touchdowns, including the game-winning 35-yard touchdown catch in overtime. In Week 13, against the Chargers, he had eight receptions for 177 receiving yards and two receiving touchdowns in the 27–20 victory. On December 21, 2022, Adams was named to his sixth consecutive Pro Bowl.

NFL career statistics

Regular season

Postseason

Personal life
Adams married Devanne Villarreal on June 2, 2018.

See also
List of National Football League annual receiving touchdowns leaders
List of NCAA major college football yearly receiving leaders

References

External links

Las Vegas Raiders bio
Fresno State Bulldogs bio 

1992 births
Living people
American Conference Pro Bowl players
American football wide receivers
Fresno State Bulldogs football players
Green Bay Packers players
Las Vegas Raiders players
National Conference Pro Bowl players
People from East Palo Alto, California
People from Redwood City, California
Players of American football from California
Sportspeople from Palo Alto, California
Sportspeople from the San Francisco Bay Area